William Ellis Stanyon (January 1870 – September 1951) was a professional magician and magic dealer in London.

History

Stanyon published and edited his own journal known as Magic. The journal's aim was to‚ 'popularize the Art of Sleight of Hand'. It was first published from October 1900 and ran for 177 issues with a break during World War I; the final issue was published in June 1920.

Stanyon in his journal published a method of escaping from packed boxes. Biographer Kenneth Silverman has written that the magician Harry Houdini "accused Stanyon of having posted a bounty of several pounds for his secrets... Houdini dismissed the methods purveyed by Stanyon and others as being nothing like his own, "puny attempts at duplication."

Magic historian Henry R. Evans wrote that Stanyon was "one of the most prolific writers on legerdemain in the world, and his hand-books on magic are largely sought after."

Published works

Conjuring With Cards (1898)
Hand Shadows (1900)
New Miscellaneous Tricks (1900)
New Coin Tricks (1900)
New Juggling Tricks (1901)
Card Tricks (1900)
New Card Tricks (1900)
Conjuring For Amateurs (1901)
New Handkerchief Tricks (1909)
Magic (1910)

See also
 List of magicians
 Coin magic
 Sleight of hand

References

External links
 
 
Ellis Stanyon MAGIC bibliography
New Juggling Tricks, Stanyon, 1901

1870 births
1951 deaths
British magicians
Card magic
Coin magic
Harry Houdini
Historians of magic
People from Harborough District
Sleight of hand